The Little Buckaroo is a 1928 American silent Western film directed by Louis King and starring Buzz Barton, Milburn Morante and Peggy Shaw.

Cast
 Buzz Barton as David 'Red' Hepner 
 Milburn Morante as Toby Jones 
 Peggy Shaw as Ann Crawford 
 Kenneth MacDonald as Jack Pemberton 
 Al Ferguson as Luke Matthews 
 Walter Maly as Sam Baxter 
 Bob Burns as Sheriff Al Durking 
 Florence Lee as Mrs. Durking 
 Jim Welch as Jim Crawford

References

External links
 

1928 films
1928 Western (genre) films
American black-and-white films
Film Booking Offices of America films
Films directed by Louis King
Silent American Western (genre) films
1920s English-language films
1920s American films